Algol: The Magazine About Science Fiction was published from 1963–1984 by Andrew Porter. The headquarters was in New York City. The name was changed to Starship in 1979.

It won a Hugo Award for Best Fanzine in 1974, in a tie with Richard E. Geis' Science Fiction Review; and received five other nominations for the Hugo (1973, 1975, 1976, and 1981). Initially a two-page fanzine printed by spirit duplicator, it expanded rapidly, moving to offset covers, then adding mimeographed contents, ultimately becoming a printed publication with the 16th issue. It went to a full color cover with the 24th issue; ultimately the circulation rose to 7,000. Columnists at various times included Ted White, Richard A. Lupoff, Susan Wood, Vincent Di Fate, Robert Silverberg, Frederik Pohl, Joe Sanders, and Bhob Stewart.

References

External links
Algol entry at isfdb.org
Starship entry at isfdb.org

Defunct science fiction magazines published in the United States
Hugo Award-winning works
Magazines established in 1963
Magazines disestablished in 1984
Magazines published in New York City
Science fiction fanzines
Science fiction magazines established in the 1960s